The 1990–91 SEC women's basketball season began with practices in October 1990, followed by the start of the 1990–91 NCAA Division I women's basketball season in November. Conference play started in early January 1991 and concluded in February, followed by the 1991 SEC women's basketball tournament in Albany, Georgia.

Preseason

Preseason All-SEC teams

Coaches select 5 players
Players in bold are choices for SEC Player of the Year

Rankings

SEC regular season

Postseason

SEC tournament

Honors and awards

All-SEC awards and teams

References

 
Southeastern Conference women's basketball seasons